The Verhofstadt III government was an interim Belgian government inaugurated on December 21, 2007 and lasting until 23 March 2008. It was led by Belgian Prime Minister Guy Verhofstadt government and contained representatives from the Open Flemish Liberals and Democrats (Open VLD), Flemish Christian Democrats (CD&V), the Francophone Socialists (PS), the Francophone Liberals (MR) and Francophone Christian Democrats (CDH).

It was succeeded by a permanent government led by CD&V leader Yves Leterme.

Formation of government

When the Parliament confirmed the formation of this interim Government, it had been 196 days since the Belgian people had voted out the previous coalition, the longest period of formation in Belgian history at the time.

Composition of government
The government consisted only of ministers. The composition of the interim Government as decided in the inaugural Council of Ministers is as follows:

The Restricted Council of Ministers (KERN) is the arbitration arm of the executive, which arbitrates disputes within the Government. Under the interim Government, it consists of the Prime Minister and five members of Government representing the five parties in coalition, namely both Deputy Prime Ministers as well as the Minister of Employment, the Minister of Social Affairs and Public Health and the Minister of the Interior.

Under the interim Government deal, it was understood that Yves Leterme will take over the post of Prime Minister no later than 23 March. On March 20, Leterme officially succeeded Verhofstadt and a new government was formed.

Government declaration
The government declaration to which the parties agreed consists of ten points. The main task of the government is to prepare the 2008 budget. Social security benefits will be increased, and businesses will see their shift work costs reduced. A service agreement will be negotiated with the national railway operator. A national security plan is proposed, and the Treaty of Lisbon will see a quick ratification.

Government policy
One of the first actions of the newly installed government was to raise the Belgian security level in response to a possible Islamic terrorist threat.

See also
2007–2011 Belgian political crisis

References

Belgian governments
2007 establishments in Belgium
2008 disestablishments in Belgium
Cabinets established in 2007
Cabinets disestablished in 2008